Hannah Courtoy (1784 - 26 January 1849), born Hannah Peters, was a London society woman who inherited a fortune from the merchant John Courtoy in 1815. Her distinctive Egyptian-style mausoleum in London's Brompton Cemetery has been the subject of considerable curiosity and speculation ever since a report by Reuters in 1998 repeated claims that it contained a working time machine.

Life
Hannah Courtoy was born Hannah Peters in 1784. She had three daughters out of wedlock, Mary Ann (1801), Elizabeth (1804-1876), and Susannah (1807-1895). In 1830, Susannah married Septimus Holmes Godson, a barrister of Gray's Inn.

In 1815, Courtoy inherited a fortune from the elderly merchant John Courtoy (born Nicholas Jacquinet in France, 1709) through a Will that was disputed in court.

Death
Courtoy died on 26 January 1849, at 14 Wilton Crescent, Belgrave Square, one of the most expensive areas of London. Her Will is held in the British National Archives.

Tomb
Courtoy's distinctive Egyptian-style mausoleum of 1854 in Brompton Cemetery, where her unmarried daughters Elizabeth and Mary Ann are also interred, has been the subject of considerable curiosity because of rumours that it might be or contain a working time machine, a speculation that has been fuelled by various articles and recordings made by the musician Stephen Coates of the band The Real Tuesday Weld

The Egyptologist Joseph Bonomi the Younger is buried nearby.

See also
 Samuel Alfred Warner

References

External links 
http://archiver.rootsweb.ancestry.com/th/read/LONDON/2002-09/1033238863
http://www.rogerclarke.com/Family/S/Courtoy-Newsletter21.htm.html
Time Space and the City
The Brompton Time Machine by The Real Tuesday Weld

1784 births
1849 deaths
Burials at Brompton Cemetery
18th-century English women
18th-century English people
19th-century English women
19th-century English people